The Joint Operations, Plans and Training Directorate is the branch of the Namibian Defence Force responsible for the force employment.

History
The directorate was formed in 1990 at the inception of the Defence Force and was known as the Directorate Policy and Operations. The inaugural Director for Operations was Brigadier General Martin Shalli.The Directrrate was later renamed to Operations, Plans and Training. The directorate is responsible for developing and archiving and revising plans, doctrines for the force. The directorate was renamed to Joint Operations inline with the increased combined nature of the Force. The rank of the Chief of Staff was increased from Brigadier to Major General.

Organisation
The directorate is divided into the Operations, Plans, and Training Divisions. Divisions are led by Senior Staff Officers with the rank of colonel or its Air Force and Navy equivalents.

Leadership

References

Military of Namibia